Máximo Orlando Banguera Valdivieso (born 16 December 1985) is an Ecuadorian footballer who plays as a goalkeeper who plays for Delfín in the Ecuadorian Serie A and the Ecuador national team.

Club career
Banguera attracted attention early in his career while playing for ESPOLI in the Ecuadorian Serie B. He then played with Ecuadorian Serie A side Barcelona from 2009 to 2019, making over 400 appearances and winning league titles in 2012 and 2016.

Banguera signed with El Nacional ahead of the 2020 season after 10 years with Barcelona. However, he failed to make an appearance for the club and served as a backup to Johan Padilla. Banguera joined Delfín in September of that year.

In September 2022, Banguera was given a three-game suspension for a physical altercation with Mushuc Runa player Franklin Carabalí.

International career
Bannguera won a gold medal with Ecuador at the 2007 Pan American Games.

Banguera was called up to play against Mexico in November 2008. He played all of the ninety minutes and performed well.

After Marcelo Elizaga's retirement following the 2011 Copa America, Banguera was consolidated as the first choice Goalkeeper for Ecuador. Due to injuries, he was only able to start a few games at the 2014 FIFA World Cup Qualifiers. Eventually losing his starting spot to Velez Sarfield's Alexander Domínguez.

Due to his declining performances even before the 2014 FIFA World Cup, he was eventually replaced by Ecuadorian-naturalized Goalkeepers, Librado Azcona and Esteban Dreer. Subsequently, Banguera was left out of the 2015 Copa America squad.

Honors

Club
Barcelona
 Serie A: 2012, 2016

References

External links

1985 births
Living people
Sportspeople from Guayaquil
Ecuadorian footballers
Ecuador international footballers
Association football goalkeepers
C.D. ESPOLI footballers
Barcelona S.C. footballers
2011 Copa América players
2014 FIFA World Cup players
Copa América Centenario players
2019 Copa América players
Pan American Games competitors for Ecuador
Footballers at the 2007 Pan American Games
Medalists at the 2007 Pan American Games
Pan American Games gold medalists for Ecuador
Pan American Games medalists in football